Randolph Frederich Rodrigues Alves (Garanhuns, 6 November 1972), commonly known as Randolfe Rodrigues, is a Brazilian journalist and politician. Since 2011, Rodrigues serves as a Senator for the state of Amapá. He is the leader of the opposition to the Bolsonaro government in the Federal Senate.It was the most voted in the history of the state of Amapá in the 2010 Elections. During Dilma Rousseff's impeachment process, he defended that, if it were for the whole work, he would also have to remove Vice-President Michel Temer. In the 2018 elections, he was re-elected senator.

References

|-

1972 births
People from Amapá
Brazilian police officers
Brazilian journalists
Members of the Federal Senate (Brazil)
Living people
Sustainability Network politicians
Socialism and Liberty Party politicians
Workers' Party (Brazil) politicians
Members of the Legislative Assembly of Amapá
People from Garanhuns